Kevin Kewley (born 2 March 1955) is an English former professional football  player and coach.

Active in England and the United States, he played as a midfielder and made over 450 career appearances, scoring over 120 goals. After retiring as a player he was active as a coach at both professional and college-level.

Playing career
Born in Liverpool, Kewley signed for Liverpool in 1970, turning professional in March 1972. He made one first-team appearance for Liverpool, appearing as a substitute in January 1978. He spent loan spells in the United States with the Dallas Tornado in the 1976 and 1977 seasons, later signing permanently with them. He later played for the Wichita Wings.

Coaching career
After coaching the Wichita Wings, Kewley later also coached Pratt Community College and Barton Community College. He was the 2015 KJCCC 'Coach of the Year'.

References

1955 births
Living people
English footballers
English football managers
Liverpool F.C. players
Dallas Tornado players
Wichita Wings (MISL) players
English Football League players
North American Soccer League (1968–1984) players
Major Indoor Soccer League (1978–1992) players
Major Indoor Soccer League (1978–1992) coaches
National Professional Soccer League (1984–2001) coaches
USISL coaches
Association football midfielders
English expatriate footballers
English expatriate football managers
English expatriate sportspeople in the United States
Expatriate soccer players in the United States
Expatriate soccer managers in the United States